Leonora of the Seven Seas (Portuguese:Leonora dos sete mares) is a 1955 Brazilian mystery film directed by Carlos Hugo Christensen.

Cast
 Sadi Cabral
 Wilza Carla 
 Annie Carol 
 Edgar Cassitas 
 Miro Cerni
 Arturo de Córdova 
 Sérgio de Oliveira 
 Modesto De Souza 
 Moacyr Deriquém  
 Bibi Ferreira 
 Claudiano Filho
 Jardel Filho 
 Susana Freyre 
 Heloísa Helena 
 Labanca
 Anilza Leoni 
 Armando Louzada
 Oswaldo Louzada 
 Rodolfo Mayer 
 Arnaldo Paulo Montel 
 Paulo Montel
 Henriette Morineau
 Elza Mumme 
 Sara Nobre  
 Adriano Reys 
 Maria Luiza Splendore
 Afonso Stuart
 Solano Trindade

References

Bibliography 
 Plazaola, Luis Trelles. South American Cinema. La Editorial, UPR, 1989.

External links 
 

1955 films
1950s mystery films
Brazilian mystery films
1950s Portuguese-language films
Films directed by Carlos Hugo Christensen
Brazilian black-and-white films